is the debut studio album by Japanese singer Kyary Pamyu Pamyu, released on May 23, 2012.

The album includes the first two physical singles released by Kyary, "Tsukematsukeru" and "Candy Candy", as well as "PonPonPon", which was also included on her debut EP Moshi Moshi Harajuku. The limited edition of the album comes with a 64-page photobook with pages 41–61 taken in Los Angeles, and a bonus DVD with music videos and two live versions taken from Kyary's Moshi Moshi Quattro Live, held on February 25, 2012, at Shibuya's Club Quattro.

The album debuted at number one on the Oricon daily chart, and was certified Gold by the RIAJ. Though Kyary Pamyu Pamyu only promoted Pamyu Pamyu Revolution in Japan, the album and its singles saw success internationally. "PonPonPon" topped the iTunes Electronic Songs charts in Belgium and Finland. The "Tsukematsukeru" EP peaked at number eight on the U.S. Billboard Top World Albums chart. The album topped the iTunes Electronic Albums charts in the United States, France, and Belgium.

The album was also released in Taiwan on March 15, 2013 and debuted at number three of G-Music's J-pop Albums Chart and number nineteen of the G-Music's Combo Albums Chart.

Track listing

Personnel
Credits adapted from liner notes.
Yasutaka Nakata – written, played, arranged, produced, recorded, mixed, mastered
Steve Nakamura – art director, designer
Takeshi Hanzawa – photographer
Shinji Konishi – hair, make-up
Kumiko Iijima – stylist
Yusuke Nakagawa – executive producer
Kei Ishizaka – executive producer
Ryoma Suzuki – label head
Tsuyoshi Ishii – general producer
Satoru Yamazaki – artist management
Harumi Ito – A&R
Satoshi Kido – sales promotion
Noriko Ohara – digital planning

Charts

Sales and certifications

References

External links
 Official website
 

2012 albums
Albums produced by Yasutaka Nakata
Kyary Pamyu Pamyu albums
Unborde albums